Bert is a commune in the Allier department in central France.

Population

Administration 
 2008–2020: Jacques Caillault
 2020–2026: Michel Vivier

See also
Communes of the Allier department

References

Communes of Allier
Allier communes articles needing translation from French Wikipedia